Frederick Charles Édouard Alexis Hesling (1869–1934) was the first governor of French Upper Volta, a post he held from May 1919 to December 1927.

Colonial Governors of French Upper Volta
1869 births
1934 deaths